The Swan 431 was designed by Olin Stephens as a flush deck racing yacht to S&S design #2238 only one boat was produced in 1975. However the deck moulding was changed to a cruiser/racer version with the typical wedge deck and 32 hulls were delivered during a production run that started in 1976 and ended in 1978 produced by Nautor's Swan.

External links
 Nautor Swan
 S&S Swan Owners Association

References

Sailing yachts
Keelboats
1980s sailboat type designs
Sailboat types built by Nautor Swan
Sailboat type designs by Sparkman and Stephens
Sailboat type designs by Olin Stephens